Fershgenet Melaku, better known as LoLa Monroe and previously known as Angel Melaku, is an American rapper, model, and actress.

Early life
Melaku was born in Addis Ababa and raised in Washington D.C. She is of Ethiopian descent.  She began writing poems and songs at the age of 12.

Career
Monroe made her acting debut in the Wendy Williams biopic Queen of Media and later acted in Crazy like a Fox. She began modeling and appearing in music videos for various artists such as Kanye West and Trey Songz. She later became LoLa Monroe in 2007; "Monroe" is a reference to the actress, model, film producer and singer Marilyn Monroe.

In June 2009, Monroe released her first mixtape, Boss Bitch's World. Her second mixtape, The Lola Monroe Chronicles: The Art of Motivation, was issued in October. She also released her collaboration mixtape Untouchables later the same year.

In September 2010, Monroe released her mixtape's first single, "Overtime". A video for the song was also recorded and premiered on 106 & Park. In December 2010, LoLa released her fourth mixtape, Batteries Not Included.

Monroe was nominated for Best Female Hip Hop Artist at the BET Awards of 2011.

In October 2011, Monroe was announced as Taylor Gang's first lady, and signed to the label. Her first mixtape to be released under the label was Lipstick & Pistols. After many push backs, the mixtape released on October 23, 2013.

On September 4, 2013 she released her debut single "B.B. (Boss Bitch)" featuring Chevy Woods and Juicy J, produced by Sledgren and supposed to be on her debut album. Then on September 19, she along with producer Cardo left Taylor Gang and dismissed their affiliation with the label. LoLa Monroe later confirmed that she had never signed to the label in the first place.

Artists who have influenced her musical style include Jay-Z, MC Lyte, Trina, Salt-n-Pepa, Lauryn Hill and Tupac Shakur.

Personal life 
On December 25, 2012, Monroe announced that she and rapper King Los were expecting their first child together. She gave birth to a boy in March 2013.

Discography

Mixtapes
 Boss Bitch's World (2009)
 The Lola Monroe Chronicles: The Art of Motivation (2009)
 Untouchables (with Lil Boosie) (2009)
 Batteries Not Included (2010)
 Lipstick & Pistols (2013)
 Boss Bitch's World 2 (2013)

Singles

Guest appearances

Filmography

References

External links
 

Living people
Actresses from Washington, D.C.
African-American actresses
Female models from Washington, D.C.
American women rappers
Ethiopian emigrants to the United States
Hip hop models
Rappers from Washington, D.C.
1986 births
21st-century American rappers
21st-century American women musicians
African-American women rappers
21st-century African-American women
21st-century African-American musicians
20th-century African-American people
20th-century African-American women
American people of Ethiopian descent
21st-century women rappers